Homer D. Call (September 19, 1843 in Truxton, Cortland County, New York – April 1929) was an American labor leader and politician.

Life
On October 1, 1861, he enrolled at Cortland, New York, and was mustered in as corporal of the 76th NY Volunteers to fight in the American Civil War. On December 13, 1862, he was wounded in the Battle of Fredericksburg. In July 1863, he was commissioned a second lieutenant, and in February 1864 a first lieutenant. He was captured in action on May 5, 1864, during the Battle of the Wilderness, later paroled, and discharged in February 1865.

After the war, he settled in Syracuse, New York, and worked as a meat cutter, and later ran a meat market and grocery. He was Secretary and Treasurer of the Butchers and Meat Cutters of North America from 1897 to 1917, and a vice president of the American Federation of Labor.

In 1912, he ran on the Progressive and Independence League tickets for Secretary of State of New York, but was defeated by Democrat Mitchell May. After the suicide of Treasurer John J. Kennedy on February 15, 1914, neither Democrats nor Republicans had a majority on joint ballot in the New York State Legislature due to the presence of 19 Progressive members. The Progressives offered the Republicans a deal, but were turned down. Then they combined with the Democrats and, on February 25, elected Call New York State Treasurer to fill Kennedy's unexpired term (98 votes for Call, 96 votes for the Republican candidate William Archer) with the understanding that the Democratic officials, including Deputy Treasurer George W. Batten would continue at their posts in the Treasury. In November 1914, Call ran on the Progressive and Independence League tickets for re-election, but was defeated by Republican James L. Wells.

References
The Political Graveyard: Index to Politicians: Cali to Callaghan at Political Graveyard
 The Progressive ticket, in NYT on September 7, 1912
 Call elected, in NYT on February 26, 1914
 The Progressive ticket, in NYT on August 28, 1914
 The Citizens' Union's endorsements of candidates for delegate to the Constitutional Convention, in NYT on October 25, 1914
 Quits "Friends of Peace", in NYT on August 24, 1915
 The Samuel Gompers Papers (page 506) (gives birth 1842 in Fabius, NY)
American Blue-book of Biography: Prominent Americans of 1914 by Thomas William Herringshaw (American Publishers Association, 1914) [gives birth 1843 in Truxton]
76th NYSV – Roster C at www.bpmlegal.com Transcription of war records from the Adjutant General's Office, New York (age given as 20 in 1861)

1843 births
1929 deaths
New York State Treasurers
Politicians from Syracuse, New York
Trade unionists from New York (state)
American Federation of Labor people
People from Truxton, New York
Union Army officers
People of New York (state) in the American Civil War
New York (state) Progressives (1912)
20th-century American politicians
United States Independence Party politicians
Military personnel from Syracuse, New York
Amalgamated Meat Cutters people